Partido Comunista is Spanish and Portuguese for Communist Party. Therefore, it may refer to any of the following political parties:

 Angolan Communist Party
 Argentine Workers' Communist Party
 Bolshevik Communist Party
 Brazilian Communist Party
 Brazilian Communist Party (1992)
 Chilean Communist Party (Proletarian Action)
 Clandestine Colombian Communist Party
 Colombian Communist Party
 Colombian Communist Party - Maoist
 Communist Party (Marxist-Leninist) of Bolivia
 Communist Party (Marxist-Leninist) of Panama
 Communist Party of Andalusia
 Communist Party of Aragon (1980)
 Communist Party of Argentina
 Communist Party of Argentina (Extraordinary Congress)
 Communist Party of Bolivia
 Communist Party of Bolivia (Marxist-Leninist)
 Communist Party of Brazil
 Communist Party of Castile – La Mancha
 Communist Party of Chile
 Communist Party of Colombia (Marxist-Leninist)
 Communist Party of Costa Rica
 Communist Party of Cuba
 Communist Party of Ecuador
 Communist Party of Ecuador - Red Sun
 Communist Party of El Salvador
 Communist Party of Extremadura
 Communist Party of Guatemala (disambiguation), various organizations
 Communist Party of Honduras
 Communist Party of Labour
 Communist Party of Madrid
 Communist Party of Mexico (Marxist-Leninist)
 Communist Party of Mozambique
 Communist Party of National Liberation
 Communist Party of Nicaragua
 Communist Party of Panama
 Communist Party of Peru
 Communist Party of Peru (Marxist-Leninist)
 Communist Party of Peru - Red Fatherland
 Communist Party of Portugal (in Construction)
 Communist Party of Portugal (Marxist-Leninist)
 Communist Party of Portugal (Marxist-Leninist) (1974)
 Communist Party of Spain (disambiguation), various organizations
 Communist Party of the Balearic Islands
 Communist Party of the Menadores
 Communist Party of the Peoples of Spain
 Communist Party of the Portuguese Workers / Reorganizative Movement of the Party of the Proletariat
 Communist Party of the Region of Murcia
 Communist Party of the Valencian Country
 Communist Party of the Valencian Country - Revolutionary Marxist
 Communist Party of Uruguay
 Communist Party of Venezuela
 Communist Party (Reconstructed)
 Communist Party - Red Star
 Dominican Communist Party
 Guatemalan Party of Labour - Communist Party
 International Communist Party (Dominican Republic)
 Libertarian Communist Party (Brazil)
 Libertarian Communist Party (Spain)
 Marxist-Leninist Communist Party of Ecuador
 Marxist-Leninist Communist Party of Honduras
 Mexican Communist Party
 Paraguayan Communist Party
 Paraguayan Communist Party (Marxist-Leninist)
 Peruvian Communist Party
 Peruvian Communist Party (Red Flag)
 Portuguese Communist Party
 Puerto Rican Communist Party
 Revolutionary Communist Party of Argentina
 Revolutionary Communist Party (Brazil)
 Revolutionary Communist Party (Chile)
 Revolutionary Communist Party (Peru)
 Revolutionary Communist Party - Red Trench
 Revolutionary Communist Party (Spain)
 Revolutionary Communist Party (Working Class)
 Spanish Communist Party
 Spanish Communist Workers' Party (1921)
 Spanish Communist Workers' Party (1973)
 Unified Communist Party of Spain
 Workers' Communist Party (Spain)